Riccardo Ramazzotti (born 7 August 1979) is an Italian footballer who plays as a forward.

Appearances on Italian Series 

Serie A : 0 Apps

Serie C1 : 6 Apps

Serie C2 : 16 Apps, 1 Goal

Serie D : 2 Apps

Eccellenza : 107 Apps, 46 Goals

Promozione : 29 Apps, 27 Goals

Total : 160 Apps, 74 Goals

References 
http://www.gualdocalcio.it/squadra0910/ramazzotti.htm

1979 births
Living people
People from Frascati
A.S. Gubbio 1910 players
Association football forwards
Italian footballers
Footballers from Lazio
Sportspeople from the Metropolitan City of Rome Capital